For the Eurovision Song Contest 1994, the United Kingdom entered "Lonely Symphony (We Will Be Free)", performed by Frances Ruffelle. It received 63 points and 10th place.

Before Eurovision

Artist selection
Frances Ruffelle was revealed by the BBC as the British entrant for the 1994 Eurovision Song Contest.

A Song for Europe 1994 
Two songs each, both performed by Frances Ruffelle, were premiered during four preview programmes on BBC1 between 5 and 12 March 1994. Eight songs competed in the televised final on 18 March 1994 held at the BBC Television Centre in London and hosted by Terry Wogan following a similar format of the past two years. The show was broadcast on BBC1 and BBC Radio 2 with commentary by Ken Bruce.

A panel of experts provided feedback regarding the songs during the show. The panel consisted of Richard O'Brien and Jonathan King.

A public televote selected the winning song, "Lonely Symphony", which was revealed during a separate show broadcast on BBC1 and hosted by Terry Wogan.

The winning song was renamed "Lonely Symphony (We Will Be Free)" and was released by Virgin on CD single with an extended version included and on standard 7" vinyl & cassette single formats, reaching no. 25 in the UK single chart. The song was renamed again as "We Will Be Free (Lonely Symphony)" for the Eurovision final in Dublin. To date, none of the other seven songs from the 1994 contest have been officially released in any format.

At Eurovision
Frances performed 6th on the night, after Iceland and before Croatia. She picked up 63 points, finishing 10th. The UK jury awarded 12 points to runner up Poland.

Voting

References

1994
Countries in the Eurovision Song Contest 1994
Eurovision
Eurovision